Paine is a Chilean city, forming part of  Greater Santiago, and a commune in the Maipo Province, Santiago Metropolitan Region.

Demographics
Of these, 31,622 (63.2%) lived in urban areas and 18,406 (36.8%) in rural areas. The population grew by 33.3% (12,499 persons) between the 1992 and 2002 censuses.

Administration
As a commune, Paine is a third-level administrative division of Chile administered by a municipal council, headed by an alcalde who is directly elected every four years. The 2012-2016 alcalde is Diego Vergara Rodríguez (RN). The communal council has the following members:
 Patricio Achurra Garfias (PDC)
 Maximiliano Bernstein Llona (UDI)
 Juan Maureira Carreño (PPD)
 Luis Canales Canales (RN)
 Mario Campo Arias (IND)
 Bárbara Kast Sommerhoff (UDI)

Within the electoral divisions of Chile, Paine is represented in the Chamber of Deputies by Ramón Farías (PPD) and José Antonio Kast (UDI) as part of the 30th electoral district, (together with San Bernardo, Buin and Calera de Tango). The commune is represented in the Senate by Guido Girardi Lavín (PPD) and Jovino Novoa Vásquez (UDI) as part of the 7th senatorial constituency (Santiago-West).

See also 
Laguna de Aculeo
Paine Memorial

References

External links
 Municipality of Paine
 Paine Web

Communes of Chile
Populated places in Maipo Province
1927 establishments in Chile